Marooning is the intentional act of abandoning someone in an uninhabited area.

Marooning may also refer to:
 "The Marooning", an episode of Survivor:Borneo

See also
 Maroon (disambiguation)